The 2009 Tour of the Basque Country, the 66th edition of the Tour of the Basque Country stage cycling race, started on 6 April and ended on 11 April 2009. The race was won by Alberto Contador, making this his second Tour of the Basque Country victory in a row. The race was the sixth event in the inaugural UCI World Ranking series.

Stages

Stage 1
6 April 2009 – Ataun,

Stage 2
7 April 2009 – Ataun to Villatuerta,

Stage 3
8 April 2009 – Villatuerta to Éibar,

Stage 4
9 April 2009 – Éibar to Güeñes,

Stage 5
10 April 2009 – Güeñes to Zalla,

Stage 6
11 April 2009 – Zalla,  (ITT)

Final standings

Jersey progress

Withdrawals

References

External links

2009
2009 UCI ProTour
2009 in Spanish road cycling
2009 UCI World Ranking